The 2020 season was Mjøndalen IF's second successive season in the Eliteserien following their promotion in 2018.

Season events
On 12 June, the Norwegian Football Federation announced that a maximum of 200 home fans would be allowed to attend the upcoming seasons matches.

On 10 September, the Norwegian Football Federation cancelled the 2020 Norwegian Cup due to the COVID-19 pandemic in Norway.

On 30 September, the Minister of Culture and Gender Equality, Abid Raja, announced that clubs would be able to have crowds of 600 at games from 12 October.

Squad

Out on loan

Transfers

In

Out

Loans out

Released

Competitions

Eliteserien

Results summary

Results by round

Results

Table

Relegation playoffs

Norwegian Cup

Squad statistics

Appearances and goals

|-
|colspan="14"|Players away from Mjøndalen on loan:

|-
|colspan="14"|''Players who left Mjøndalen during the season
|}

Goal scorers

Clean sheets

Disciplinary record

References

Mjøndalen IF
Mjøndalen IF Fotball seasons